In computing, a compound document is a document that “combines multiple document formats, either by reference, by inclusion, or both.” Compound documents are often produced using word processing software, and may include text and non-text elements such as barcodes, spreadsheets, pictures, digital videos, digital audio, and other multimedia features.

Compound document technologies are commonly utilized on top of a software componentry framework, but the idea of software componentry includes several other concepts apart from compound documents, and software components alone do not enable compound documents. Well-known technologies for compound documents include:
ActiveX Documents
Bonobo by Ximian (primarily used by GNOME)
KParts in KDE
Mixed Object Document Content Architecture
Multipurpose Internet Mail Extensions (MIME)
Object linking and embedding (OLE) by Microsoft; see Compound File Binary Format
Open Document Architecture from ITU-T (not used)
OpenDoc by IBM and Apple Computer (now defunct)
RagTime
Verdantuim
XML and XSL are encapsulation formats used for compound documents of all kinds

The first public implementation of compound documents was on the Xerox Star workstation, released in 1981.

See also
 COM Structured Storage
 Transclusion

References

Electronic documents
Multimedia